Shyampur Assembly constituency is an assembly constituency in Howrah district in the Indian state of West Bengal.

Overview
As per orders of the Delimitation Commission, No. 179 Shyampur Assembly constituency  is composed of the following: Baneswarpur I, Baneswarpur II, Dingakhola, Kamalpur, Radhapur and Syampur gram panchayats of Shyampur I community development block, and Bachhri, Dihi Mondalghat I, Dihi Mondalghat II, Kharuberia, Nakol, Shashati, Amardaha and Bargram gram panchayats of Shyampur II community development block.

Shyampur Assembly constituency is part of No. 26 Uluberia (Lok Sabha constituency).

Members of Legislative Assembly

Election results

2021

2011

 

.# Swing calculated on Congress+Trinamool Congress vote percentages taken together in 2006.

1977-2006
In 2006 and 2001 state assembly elections, Kali Pada Mandal of Trinamool Congress won the Shyampur assembly seat defeating his nearest rivals Asit Baran Sau and Jaladhar Samanta, both of Forward Bloc, respectively. Contests in most years were multi cornered but only winners and runners are being mentioned. Sanjib Kumar Das of Congress defeated Jaladhar Samanta and Gour Hari Adak, both of Forward Bloc, in 1996 and 1991 respectively.  Gour Hari Adak of Forward Bloc defeated Sisir Kumar Sen of Congress in 1987 and 1982. Sasabindu Bera of Janata Party defeated Kishori Mohan Moinan of Forward Bloc in 1977.

1951-1972
Sisir Kumar Sen of Congress won in 1972 and 1971. Sasabindu Bera representing Forward Bloc won in 1969 and !967. Murari Mohan Manya of Congress won in 1962. Sasabindu Bera representing Forward Bloc (Marxists) won in 1957. In independent India's first election in 1951, Sasabindu Bera representing Forward Bloc (Marxist Group) won the Shyampur seat.

References

Assembly constituencies of West Bengal
Politics of Howrah district
1952 establishments in West Bengal
Constituencies established in 1952